The Board of Intermediate and Secondary Education, Lahore (colloquially known as BISE Lahore) is an examination board for secondary and intermediate education in Lahore Division.

Overview 
Lahore Board is the mainstream of education throughout the country. It is considered as the biggest educational board in Pakistan. Around 2 million students are examined every year through this board in matriculation and intermediate exams.

History 
Since Pakistan emerged on the map of the world in 1947, the examinations of the matriculation and intermediate level were conducted under the aegis of University of the Punjab. However, through the promulgation of the Punjab University Act (Amendment) Ordinance 1954, the Board of Secondary Education, Punjab was established in the province which took from the said university control of examinations of secondary, intermediate and Pakistani and classical languages. The first-ever examination for these stages was conducted in the year 1955.
Owing to tremendous increase in the candidature, two more Boards were established at Multan and Sargodha under West Pakistan Boards of Intermediate and Secondary Education (Multan and Sargodha) Ordinance No.XVII of 1968. As a result of further bifurcation, Boards were also established at Rawalpindi and Gujranwala. The re-construction of the Board of Intermediate and Secondary Education, Lahore has been done through the Punjab Boards of Intermediate and Secondary Education Act 1976 (lately amended by Punjab Ordinance No.XLVII). Currently, nine Boards are functioning in the Punjab province at division level.

Jurisdiction 
At the time of its inception in 1954, the Board inherited vast territorial jurisdictions for conducting examinations in the provinces of Punjab, Baluchistan, Azad Kashmir and Northern Areas (now Gilgit Baltistan). To accommodate overseas candidates, the Board also constituted examination centers at Kuwait and Nairobi (Kenya).
Current jurisdiction of the Board has been confined to the districts of Lahore, Kasur, Sheikhupura and Nankana sahib (Lahore division).

See also 
 List of educational boards in Pakistan

References

External links
 BISE Lahore official Website
 Lahore Board 10th Class Date Sheet 2023 (unofficial)

Education in Lahore
1954 establishments in Pakistan
Lahore